The 1948–49 Georgetown Hoyas men's basketball team represented Georgetown University during the 1948–49 NCAA college basketball season. Elmer Ripley coached it in his tenth season as head coach, the third season of his third stint at the helm. The team was an independent and played its home games for a second and final season at the D.C. Armory in Washington, D.C. It finished with a record of 9-15 and had no post-season play.

Season recap

Senior guard Tommy O'Keefe and senior forward Ray Corley were the stars of the team. O'Keefe was the team's top scorer for a second straight season, with a season high of 22 points in the game against the New York Athletic Club.

The 1948-49 squad started 6-3, but then lost 12 of its last 15 games to finish with a record of 9-15 – the least successful team in Ripleys ten Georgetown seasons – and had no post-season play. It was not ranked in the Top 20 in the Associated Press Poll – conducted for the first time this season – at any time.

Considered a legend in basketball, Ripley departed at the end of the season, having coached the Hoyas in three separate stints (1927-1929, 1938-1943, and 1946-1949) with an overall record of 133-82, including what was then the schools only appearance in a postseason tournament when the 1942-43 team advanced to the final game of the 1943 NCAA Tournament. He was head coach of John Carroll from 1949 to 1951, Army from 1951 to 1953, the Harlem Globetrotters from 1953 to 1956, the Israeli Olympic basketball team in 1956, and the Canadian Olympic basketball team in 1960.

Roster
Sources

Senior guard Tommy O'Keefe would later serve as Georgetowns assistant coach for four seasons from 1956 to 1960 and as head coach for six seasons from 1960 to 1966.

1948–49 schedule and results
Sources

It was common practice at this time for colleges and universities to include non-collegiate opponents in their schedules, with the games recognized as part of their official record for the season, and the games played against a United States Army team from Fort Belvoir, Virginia, and the New York Athletic Club therefore counted as part of Georgetowns won-loss record for 1948-49. It was not until 1952 after the completion of the 1951-52 season that the National Collegiate Athletic Association (NCAA) ruled that colleges and universities could no longer count games played against non-collegiate opponents in their annual won-loss records.

|-
!colspan=9 style="background:#002147; color:#8D817B;"| Regular Season

References

Georgetown Hoyas men's basketball seasons
Georgetown
Georgetown Hoyas men's basketball team
Georgetown Hoyas men's basketball team